Gavin Anthony Worboys (born 14 July 1974) is an English former footballer who scored 12 goals from 65 appearances in the Football League playing as a forward for Doncaster Rovers, Exeter City, Darlington and Northampton Town. He was on the books of Notts County, without playing for them in the League, and went on to play non-league football for clubs including Bradford Park Avenue, Hatfield Main, Armthorpe Welfare, Eastwood Town and Hucknall Town.

Life and career
Worboys was born in Doncaster, and began his football career with Doncaster Rovers. He made his debut on 8 February 1992 in a 2–1 home defeat to Cardiff City in the Fourth Division, and after seven appearances and two goals – in a 3–2 win against Scunthorpe United and a 2–0 victory over Rochdale – the 17-year-old Worboys signed for Notts County, about to be relegated from the First Division, for a fee of £100,000. He never played first-team football for Notts County. He spent time on loan at Division Two club Exeter City before dropping down a division to sign for Darlington in late 1994. He appeared more regularly for Darlington, with 8 league goals from 41 matches over 14 months with the club, although towards the end of that time his appearances were more often from the substitutes' bench. Against Cardiff City in September 1995, he took over in goal after Mike Pollitt was sent off and Darlington had no goalkeeper on the bench; he could not stop the resulting penalty, but that was the only goal he did concede. His Football League career ended at Northampton Town, with whom he spent the last few months of the 1995–96 season, taking his totals to 12 goals from 65 matches. He was still only 21.

He continued playing in non-league football with clubs including Bradford Park Avenue, Hatfield Main, Armthorpe Welfare and Eastwood Town. In the 1997–98 season, he and strike partner Glenn Kirkwood produced 35 goals between them in the Northern Premier League First Division. In 1999–2000, he helped the club reach the first round proper of the FA Cup for the first time in their history, in which they faced his former club Exeter City, and scored 24 goals over the season. He also found himself in goal again, in September 1999, this time replacing an injured goalkeeper at half-time with his team 1–0 down to Accrington Stanley. He let in just one goal, from a free kick awarded when he handled the ball outside the penalty area, and his teammates scored twice to secure a draw. He joined South Yorkshire Police during the 2000 close season, and although his job did not prevent his continuing to play for Eastwood, it did impact on his availability. In August 2001, he signed for Hucknall Town.

References

1974 births
Living people
Footballers from Doncaster
English footballers
Association football forwards
Doncaster Rovers F.C. players
Notts County F.C. players
Exeter City F.C. players
Darlington F.C. players
Northampton Town F.C. players
Bradford (Park Avenue) A.F.C. players
Hatfield Main F.C. players
Armthorpe Welfare F.C. players
Eastwood Town F.C. players
Hucknall Town F.C. players
English Football League players
Northern Premier League players
Northern Counties East Football League players